Revospirone (Bay Vq 7813) is an azapirone drug which was patented as a veterinary tranquilizer but was never marketed. It acts as a selective 5-HT1A receptor partial agonist. Similarly to other azapirones such as buspirone, revospirone produces 1-(2-pyrimidinyl)piperazine (1-PP) as an active metabolite. As a result, it also acts as an α2-adrenergic receptor antagonist to an extent.

References

5-HT1A agonists
Azapirones
Benzothiazoles
Lactams
Piperazines
Pyrimidines
Sultams